Floyd Mayweather Jr. vs Deji Olatunji was an exhibition boxing match contested between former five-division world champion Floyd Mayweather Jr. and YouTuber Deji Olatunji. The exhibition boxing bout took place on November 13, 2022 at Coca-Cola Arena in Dubai, UAE. Mayweather defeated Deji via 6th round TKO.

Background 

On 15 September 2022 it was reported by Mirror Fighting that American five-division world champion Floyd Mayweather Jr. and YouTuber Deji Olatunji were in the final stages of negotiations for an exhibition bout in Dubai for the 13th of November. The report revealed that Jack Fincham, Harley Benn, Anthony Taylor, and Paul Daley were approached to feature on the undercard.

On 20 September, it was announced that Global Titans' next event is set for 13 November at the Coca-Cola Arena, Dubai, UAE. On 26 September Mayweather Jr. and Olatunji were confirmed set to face in an exhibition bout on 13 November.

Press conferences 
Four press conferences were held in the following cities:

 13 October – TMT Gym, Las Vegas, Nevada, U.S.
 21 October – Handelsbeurs, Antwerpen, Belgium (Delfine Persoon vs Ikram Kerwat)
 4 November – York Hall, London, England
 10 November – Dubai Sports Council, Dubai, U.A.E.

Card 
The card for the fight features Floyd Mayweather Jr. vs. Deji Olatunji as the main event with Tommy Fury and Rolly Lambert as the co-main. The undercard consists of Delfine Persoon vs. Ikram Kerwat, Bobby Fish vs. Boateng Prempeh, Harley Benn vs. Faizan Anwar, J'Hon Ingram vs. Kōji Tanaka, Jack Fincham vs. Anthony Taylor, and Jaider Herrera vs. Franklin Manzanilla for the WBC International super featherweight title.

Fight card

Broadcasting

References 

2022 in boxing
Boxing in the United Arab Emirates
Boxing matches
Boxing matches involving Floyd Mayweather Jr.
Crossover boxing events
DAZN
November 2022 sports events in the United Arab Emirates
Pay-per-view boxing matches
Sport in Dubai